Folketing elections were held in Denmark on 5 September 1950, except in the Faroe Islands where they were held on 14 October. The Social Democratic Party remained the largest in the Folketing, with 59 of the 151 seats. Voter turnout was 82% in Denmark proper but just 22% in the Faroes.

Electoral system changes 
Following a new electoral law in 1948, the number of levelling seats was increased from 31 to 44 while the number of district seats was decreased from 117 to 105. In total 1 new seat was added.

Results

References

Elections in Denmark
Denmark
1950 elections in Denmark
September 1950 events in Europe